Kieni Constituency is an electoral constituency in Kenya. It is one of six constituencies in Nyeri County. The constituency was established for the 1988 elections.

Members of Parliament

Wards

References 

Constituencies in Nyeri County
Constituencies in Central Province (Kenya)
1988 establishments in Kenya
Constituencies established in 1988